Hengshi (横市) may refer to these towns in China:

Hengshi, Hunan, in Ningxiang, Hunan
Hengshi, Jiangxi, in Ganzhou, Jiangxi

See also
Hengchi, an electric car brand